The Men's Time Trial event at the 2010 South American Games was held at 11:30 on March 17.

Medalists

Results

References
Report

Cycling at the 2010 South American Games
2010 in road cycling